Dirk Theismann (born 8 June 1963 in Hamm) is a German former water polo player who competed in the 1984 Summer Olympics, in the 1988 Summer Olympics, and in the 1992 Summer Olympics.

See also
 List of Olympic medalists in water polo (men)

References

External links
 

1963 births
Living people
German male water polo players
Olympic water polo players of West Germany
Olympic water polo players of Germany
Water polo players at the 1984 Summer Olympics
Water polo players at the 1988 Summer Olympics
Water polo players at the 1992 Summer Olympics
Olympic bronze medalists for West Germany
Olympic medalists in water polo
Medalists at the 1984 Summer Olympics
Sportspeople from Hamm